The 2010 Maryland General Assembly elections took place on November 2, 2010, to choose the Delegates and Senators of the Maryland General Assembly. The 2010 U.S. House election, 2010 U.S. Senate election, and 2010 Maryland gubernatorial election occurred on the same day. All 47 seats in the State Senate and 141 seats in the House of Delegates were contested. Democrats successfully defended their current supermajorities in both chambers. In this article, legislative districts are organized geographically rather than by number for ease of locating a delegation.

In the primary election on September 14, 2010, a number of sitting Senators were challenged from within their own party. Five Senators lost their primary elections.

The following list was updated on June 17, 2010, using the candidate list from the Maryland State Board of Elections as well as news sources and candidate websites.

Election winners, minor party candidates, and those running as write-ins are listed in bold.

Senate elections

House of Delegates elections

Western Maryland

District 1A
This district covers Garrett County and a portion of southwest Allegany County, including Midland, Lonaconing, Barton, and Westernport.

Democratic
James R. "Smokey" Stanton
Republican
Wendell R. Beitzel – incumbent

District 1B
This district covers northwest and central Allegany County, including Frostburg and a portion of Cumberland.

Democratic
Kevin Kelly – incumbent
Kevin M. Shaffer

Republican
Mary Beth Pirolozzi – Cumberland City Councilwoman

District 1C
This district covers the western part of Washington County, including Hancock.

Democratic
Ronald Lohr
Republican
LeRoy Myers – incumbent

District 2A
This district covers northeast Washington County, including Smithsburg and Williamsport.

Democratic
Neil Becker – teacher in the Washington County Public School system 
Republican
Andrew A. Serafini – incumbent, appointed to the House of Delegates in 2008 following the resignation of Del. Robert A. McKee (R)
Denny Stouffer
William Joseph Wivell

District 2B
This district covers southeast Washington County, including Funkstown, Boonsboro, Keedysville and Sharpsburg.

Democratic
Brien J. Poffenberger – President of the Hagerstown-Washington County Chamber of Commerce
Republican
Ted Brennan
Neil Parrott – tea party organizer and transportation engineering and planning firm owner 

Declined

Republican
Christopher B. Shank – incumbent, challenging Sen. Donald F. Munson (R).

District 2C
This district covers Hagerstown, County Seat of Washington County.

Democratic
John P. Donoghue – incumbent 
Republican
Cort Frederick Meinelschmidt

District 3A
This district represents central Frederick County, including Frederick.

Democratic
Galen R. Clagett – incumbent 
Candy O. Greenway
Republican
Patrick Hogan
Chris Huckenpoehler
Chuck Knapp
Scott Rolle – former Frederick County State's Attorney and 2006 Republican nominee for Maryland Attorney General; though his name will appear on the ballot, Rolle suspended his campaign to take part in a History Channel show

Declined

Democratic
Sue Hecht – incumbent, is retiring

District 3B 
This district represents southern Frederick County, including Burkittsville and Brunswick, and a small portion of southeast Washington County.

Democratic
Paul Gilligan
Republican
Charles A. Jenkins – incumbent, nominated by the Washington County Republican Central Committee following the resignation of Del. Richard B. Weldon (I)
Michael Hough – nominated by the Frederick County Republican Central Committee, lost the appointment from Gov. Martin O'Malley to Del. Jenkins.

District 4A
This district covers northern Frederick County, including Middletown, Myersville, New Market, Woodsboro, Thurmont, and Emmitsburg.

Democratic
Bonita Riffle Currey – nominated by the Frederick County Democratic Central Committee
Ryan P. Trout
Republican
Kathy Afzali
Dino E. Flores, Jr.
Kelly M. Schulz
Paul S. Stull – incumbent
John L. "Lennie" Thompson, Jr.
Unaffiliated
Scott L. Guenthner

Withdrew

Republican
Joseph R. Bartlett – incumbent, withdrew amid controversy over payments by the State of Maryland to his girlfriend

District 4B
This district covers western Carroll County, including Mount Airy, New Windsor, Union Bridge, and Taneytown and a portion of southeast Frederick County.

Democratic
Timothy Schlauch – business owner, defeated for delegate in 2006 by Del. Elliott, defeated for senator in 2002 by Sen. David Brinkley (R).
Republican
Donald B. Elliott – incumbent
Bret Grossnickle
Bob Lubitz

District 5A
This district covers central and northeast Carroll County, including Westminster, Hampstead, and Manchester

Democratic
Sharon L. Baker – nominated by the Carroll County Democratic Central Committee
Francis X. Walsh – nominated by the Carroll County Democratic Central Committee
Republican
William C. Niner
Justin Ready
Nancy R. Stocksdale – incumbent 
Dave Wallace

District 9B
This district covers southern Carroll County, including Sykesville.

Democratic
Anita Lombardi Riley
Republican
Larry Helmniak
Susan Krebs – incumbent

Baltimore County

District 5B
This district covers northern Baltimore County, including the Hereford zone.

Democratic
Pete Definbaugh
Republican
Wade Kach – incumbent 
Chris Luciano
Tom Morgan
Libertarian
M. Justin Kinsey

District 6
This district covers southeast Baltimore County, including Dundalk, Edgemere, and Essex.

Democratic
Cassandra Brown-Umoh
Todd Crandell
Don Mason
Joseph J. Minnick – incumbent
Jake Mohorovic – former District 7 delegate, did not seek reelection in 2002
John A. Olszewski, Jr. – incumbent 
Raymond J. Smith
Michael H. Weir, Jr. – incumbent 
Republican
Carlton William Clendaniel
Bob Long
Ric Metzgar

District 7
This district covers eastern and north central Baltimore County, including Middle River, Rossville, and Cockeysville and part of western Harford County.

Democratic
Jeff Beard
David "SKI" Mioduszewski
James Ward Morrow
Kristina A. Sargent

Republican
Brian Bennett
Jim Berndt
Marilyn Booker – registered nurse 
Laine O. C. Clark
John Cromwell
Rick Impallaria – incumbent
Pat McDonough – incumbent 
Kathy Szeliga – former Chief of Staff to District 7 Sen. Andy Harris (R)
Roger Zajdel

Declined

Republican
J.B. Jennings – incumbent, running for the State Senate seat being vacated by Sen. Andrew P. Harris (R), who is running for Congress against Rep. Frank Kratovil (D)

District 8
This east central Baltimore County district includes Overlea, Parkville, Carney, Rosedale, Hillendale, Perry Hall, and White Marsh.

Democratic
Ruth Baisden
Cal Bowman
Eric M. Bromwell – incumbent 

Republican
Joseph C. Boteler III – incumbent 
John Cluster – former delegate, appointed by Gov. Bob Ehrlich (R) in 2003 to replace Del. Al Redmer (R) when Ehrlich appointed Redmer become Maryland Insurance Commissioner. Cluster was defeated in the 2006 general election 
Rani Merryman
Norma M. Secoura

Declined
Democratic
Todd Schuler – incumbent, running for the Baltimore County Council seat being vacated by Councilman Joseph Bartenfelder (D), who ran for County Executive.

District 10
This western Baltimore County district includes Randallstown, Milford Mill, and Woodlawn.

Democratic
Emmett C. Burns, Jr. – incumbent
Barry Chapman
Adrienne A. Jones – incumbent
Shirley Nathan-Pulliam – incumbent 
Frederick Ware-Newsome

Republican
Jeanne L. Turnock – nominated by the Baltimore County Republican Central Committee

District 11
This northwest Baltimore County district includes all or parts of Pikesville, Reisterstown, Owings Mills, Stevenson, Garrison, Glyndon, Worthington, and Mays Chapel.

Democratic
Jon S. Cardin – incumbent[www.joncardin.com]
Regg Hatcher
Dan K. Morhaim – incumbent 
Dana M. Stein – incumbent 
Republican
William D. Badore
Carol C. Byrd
J. Michael Collins
Alberto Joseph Halphen
Gregory Prush – philosopher, intellectual 
Steven J. Smith
Libertarian
Brandon Brooks

District 12A
This district covers southeast Baltimore County, including Arbutus, Catonsville, Halethorpe, and Lansdowne

Democratic
Steven J. DeBoy, Sr. – incumbent
James E. Malone, Jr. – incumbent
Republican
David "Augie" Aughenbaugh
Joseph D. "Joe" Hooe
Brian A. Matulonis
Albert L. Nalley

District 42
This central Baltimore County district includes all or parts of Towson, Timonium, Lutherville, Cockeysville, Pikesville, Rodgers Forge and Loch Raven.

Democratic
Lori Albin – Director of Legislative Affairs in the Maryland Public Defender's Office 
Oz Bengur – ran in the Democratic primary in the 3rd Congressional district in 2006 
Art Buist
David Kosak – community activist 
Stephen W. Lafferty – incumbent 
Republican
Susan Aumann – incumbent 
John C. Fiastro, Jr.
William J. Frank – incumbent 
Jack Gordon – orthopedic surgeon 
Nicholas Charles Peppersack

Howard County

District 9A
This district covers northern Howard County, including Ellicott City.

Democratic
Maryann Maher
Jonathan Weinstein
Republican
Gail H. Bates – incumbent 
Warren E. Miller – incumbent

District 12B
This district covers part of western Howard County, including Columbia and Elkridge.

Democratic
John Bailey
Elizabeth Bobo – incumbent

District 13
This district covers the southern portion of Howard County, including Columbia, Clarksville, Fulton, Jessup, Savage-Guilford and North Laurel.

Democratic
Guy Guzzone – incumbent 
Shane E. Pendergrass – incumbent 
Frank S. Turner – incumbent 
Republican
Loretta Gaffney
Ed Priola
Jeff Robinson
J'Neanne Theus

Montgomery County

District 14
This district covers northeast Montgomery County including Burtonsville, Colesville, greater Olney, Laytonsville, Brookeville, Fairland and Damascus.

Democratic
Vanessa Ali – minister 
Neeta Datt
Jodi Finkelstein
Anne R. Kaiser – incumbent 
Eric Luedtke
Robert Bo Newsome
Gerald Roper – former Commissioner of the Washington Suburban Sanitary Commission 
Craig Zucker – former Deputy Chief of Staff to Comptroller Peter Franchot
Republican
Patricia A. Fenati
Henry Kahwaty
Maria Peña-Faustino

Declined
Democratic
Karen S. Montgomery – incumbent, challenging Sen. Rona E. Kramer (D).
Herman L. Taylor, Jr. – incumbent, challenging U.S. Rep. Donna Edwards (D).

District 15
This western Montgomery County district includes Potomac, Poolesville, Barnesville, and portions of greater Germantown and Gaithersburg

Democratic
Kathleen M. Dumais – incumbent 
Brian J. Feldman – incumbent 
David Fraser-Hidalgo
Aruna Miller
Lara Wibeto
Republican
Sylvia J. Darrow
Scott Graham – nominated by the Montgomery County Republican Central Committee
Matthew Mockerman
Libertarian
Arvin Vohra

Declined
Democratic
Craig L. Rice – incumbent, running for the Montgomery Council Council District 2 seat being vacated by Councilman Mike Knapp

District 16
This southern Montgomery County district includes Bethesda, North Bethesda, Glen Echo, and Somerset.

Democratic
John Adams
Charlie Chester
Peter Dennis
Bill Farley – Somerset Town Council Member, civil rights attorney 
Bill Frick – incumbent 
Scott Goldberg – Founder, Principal, and Broker of Streamline Management LLC, and President of Montgomery County Young Democrats[www.GoldbergForDelegate.com]
Craig G. Herskowitz
Hrant Jamgochian – Director of Health Policy, United Way Worldwide 
Ariana Kelly – Environmental Health Campaign Director, MomsRising.org; Former executive director of NARAL Pro-Choice Maryland 
Susan C. Lee – incumbent 
Kyle Lierman
Michael David Sriqui
Mark Winston – lawyer, sought appointments in 2002 and 2007 that ultimately went to Del. Lee (D) and Del. Frick (D)
Republican
Jeanne Allen
Carol G. Bowis
Meyer F. Marks – nominated by the Montgomery County Republican Central Committee 

Declined
Democratic
Karen Britto – incumbent, appointed as a caretaker following Del. Bill Bronrott's resignation
William A. Bronrott – resigned to take a job in the U.S. Department of Transportation.

District 17
This central Montgomery County district includes Rockville, Gaithersburg, and Garrett Park.

Democratic
Kumar P. Barve – incumbent 
James W. Gilchrist – incumbent
Luiz R. S. Simmons – incumbent
Republican
Daniel R. Campos
Craig Frick – nominated by the Montgomery County Republican Central Committee 
Josephine J. Wang

District 18
This south central Montgomery County district includes Chevy Chase, Chevy Chase Village, North Chevy Chase, Chevy Chase View, Kensington, Martin's Additions and West Silver Spring.

Democratic
Vanessa Atterbeary
Dana Beyer – County Council staffer and physician 
Al Carr – incumbent, appointed in 2007 following the death of Del. Jane Lawton (D).
Ana Sol Gutiérrez – incumbent 
Michael K. Heney
Jeff Waldstreicher – incumbent

District 19
This central Montgomery County district includes parts of Silver Spring, Wheaton, Leisure World, Northwood/Four Corners, Aspen Hill, Kemp Mill, Olney, Derwood, Laytonsville, and unincorporated areas of  Rockville and Gaithersburg.

Democratic
Sam Arora Winner of Democratic primary.
Bonnie Cullison – former President of the Montgomery County Education Association  Winner of Democratic primary.
Hoan Dang
Jay Hutchins
Benjamin F. Kramer – incumbent  Winner of Democratic primary.
Vivian Scretchen

Republican
Tom Masser – nominated by the Montgomery County Republican Central Committee 
Linn Rivera

Declined
Democratic
Henry B. Heller – incumbent, will retire
Roger Manno – incumbent, challenging Sen. Mike Lenett (D).

District 20
This southeast Montgomery County district includes Takoma Park and parts of Silver Spring and Wheaton.

Democratic
Elihu Eli El
Robert Jonathan Estrada
Sheila E. Hixson – incumbent 
Tom Hucker – incumbent 
Heather R. Mizeur – incumbent 
Chris Stoughton

District 39
This central Montgomery County district includes all or parts of Montgomery Village, Hadley Farms, Washington Grove, Flower Hill, Germantown, North Potomac, Darnestown and Derwood.

Democratic
Charles E. Barkley – incumbent 
Robert J. Hydorn – President of the Montgomery Village Board of Directors Foundation 
Arthur H. Jackson
Tony Puca
Kirill Reznik – incumbent 
Shane Robinson
Republican
Jim Pettit
Al Phillips
Bill Witham

Declined
Democratic
Saqib Ali – incumbent, challenging Sen. Nancy J. King (D).

Prince George's County

District 21
This district covers northwest Prince George's County, including Laurel, Adelphi, Langley Park, Beltsville and College Park, as well as part of northwest Anne Arundel County.

Democratic
Ben Barnes – incumbent 
Barbara A. Frush – incumbent 
Brian K. McDaniel
Joseline Peña-Melnyk – incumbent 
Devin F. Tucker
Republican
Scott W. Dibiasio
Kat Nelson
Jason W. Papanikolas
Libertarian
K. Bryan Walker

District 22
This district covers north central Prince George's County, including Greenbelt, New Carrollton, Hyattsville, and Riverdale Park.

Democratic
 Tawanna P. Gaines – incumbent 
Anne Healey – incumbent 
Alonso Washington – incumbent

District 23A
This district covers eastern Prince George's County, including north Bowie.

Democratic
Shukoor Ahmed 
Terence D. Collins
Paulette Faulkner
James W. Hubbard – incumbent 
Lisa Ransom
Geraldine Valentino-Smith
Nicole A. Williams
Republican
Margaret I. Moodie

Declined

Democratic
Gerron Levi – incumbent, running for Prince George's County Executive

District 23B
This district covers western Prince George's County, including south Bowie.

Democratic
Robin Breedon
Marvin E. Holmes, Jr. – incumbent

District 24
This Prince George's County district straddles the west corner of Washington, D.C. and includes Fairmount Heights, Seat Pleasant, Capitol Heights, and Glenarden.

Democratic
Clayton Anthony Aarons
Tiffany Alston
Nancy L. Dixon-Saxon
Greg Hall
Carolyn J. B. Howard – incumbent 
Sherry James-Strother
Michael Oputa
Byron Richardson
Michael L. Vaughn – incumbent 
Kenneth Williams

Declined

Democratic
Joanne C. Benson – incumbent, challenging Senator Nathaniel Exum (D).

District 25
This district covers central Prince George's County, including District Heights, Walker Mill, Forestville and Morningside.

Democratic
Erek Barron
Aisha N. Braveboy – incumbent
Dereck E. Davis – incumbent 
Antonio Faunteroy
Melony G. Griffith – incumbent
Davion E. Percy
Michelle R. Wright

District 26
This district covers southwest Prince George's County, including Oxon Hill-Glassmanor.

Democratic
Ollie Anderson
Hopal "Hope" Felton
Sidney L. Gibson
Branndon D. Jackson
Veronica L. Turner – incumbent
Kris Valderrama – incumbent 
Jay Walker – incumbent

District 27A
This district covers southern Prince George's County, including Upper Marlboro and Eagle Harbor, and a small portion of northwest Calvert County.

Democratic
Barry A. Adams
Percel Alston – Prince George's County police officer, President of Fraternal Order of Police Lodge 89 
Sheri L. Beach
Jeffrey L. Brockington
Russell P. Butler
Theron Green
Joe Harris
James E. Proctor, Jr. – incumbent 
Joseph F. Vallario, Jr. – incumbent
James Woods
Republican
Mike Hethmon
Antoinette "Toni" Jarboe-Duley

District 47
This Prince George's County district straddles the Montgomery County and Washington, D.C. lines and includes Mount Rainier, Colmar Manor, Bladensburg, Cheverly, and Landover Hills.

Democratic
Anthony Cicoria
Mary Jane Coolen
Diana M. Fennell
Jolene Ivey – incumbent 
Wanda Shelton Martin
Doyle L. Niemann – incumbent 
Fred Price, Jr.
Michael G. Summers – running on a ticket with Dels. Ivey and Ramirez 
Lamar A. Thorpe
Republican
Rachel Audi

Declined

Democratic
Victor R. Ramirez – incumbent, challenging Sen. David C. Harrington (D).

Southern Maryland

District 27B
This district covers central Calvert County, including Prince Frederick, North Beach, and Chesapeake Beach.

Democratic
Sue Kullen – incumbent 
Republican
Mike Blasey
Mark N. Fisher
Bob Schaefer

District 28
This district covers the majority of Charles County, including La Plata, Waldorf, Indian Head, and Port Tobacco Village.

Democratic
Jim Easter
Craig James Hickerson
Gary V. Hodge
Bud Humbert
Sally Y. Jameson – incumbent 
Peter Murphy – incumbent 
C. T. Wilson
Republican
Kirk W. Bowie
Mike Phillips
Daniel D. Richards – nominated by the Charles County Republican Central Committee

Declined

Democratic
Murray D. Levy – incumbent, will retire

District 29A
This district covers north and east Saint Mary's County, including Leonardtown, and a small section of eastern Charles County.

Democratic
John F. Wood, Jr. – incumbent
Republican
Henry E. Camaioni
Joe DiMarco
Matt Morgan

District 29B
This district covers southern Saint Mary's County.

Democratic
John L. Bohanan, Jr. – incumbent 
Republican
Erik Anderson

District 29C
This district covers southern Calvert County, including Lusby, and a section of the Patuxent River watershed in Saint Mary's County.

Democratic
Chris Davies
Republican
Anthony J. O'Donnell – incumbent, House Minority Leader
Libertarian
Shawn P. Quinn

Anne Arundel County

District 21
see above in the Prince George's County section

District 30
This district covers east central Anne Arundel County, including Annapolis, Arnold, Highland Beach, Mayo, and Shady Side.

Democratic
Michael E. Busch – incumbent, Speaker of the House of Delegates 
Virginia P. Clagett – incumbent 
Judd Legum
Shirley May Little
Republican
Ron George – incumbent 
Seth Howard
Herbert H. McMillan – former District 30 delegate, challenged and lost to Sen. John Astle in 2006

District 31
This district covers northeast Anne Arundel County, including Glen Burnie and Pasadena.

Democratic
Jeremiah Chiappelli
Robert L. Eckert
Stan Janor
Justin M. Towles
Republican
James C. Braswell
Donald H. Dwyer – incumbent 
Nic Kipke – incumbent 
Steve Schuh – incumbent 
Libertarian
Joshua Matthew Crandall
Constitution
Cory Faust, Sr.

District 32
This district covers north central Anne Arundel County, including Linthicum, Fort Meade, Severn, and parts of Odenton.

Democratic
Pamela Beidle – incumbent 
Mary Ann Love – incumbent
Ted Sophocleus – incumbent 
Republican
Stephanie A. Hodges
George Law – initially filed to run as a Democrat 
Wayne Smith
David P. Starr
Derick D. Young

District 33A
This district covers central Anne Arundel County, including Crofton and parts of Severna Park and Odenton.

Democratic
Madonna Brennan
Republican
Vic Bernson – Member of the Anne Arundel County Board of Education 
David Boschert
Tony McConkey – incumbent 
Sid Saab – Member of the Republican State Central Committee, District 33 
Cathy Vitale – Councilwoman, District 5, Anne Arundel County Council 

Declined

Republican
James King – incumbent, challenging Sen. Edward R. Reilly (R), who was appointed in 2009 following the resignation of Sen. Janet Greenip (R).

District 33B
This district covers southern Anne Arundel County, including Riva and Herring Bay

Republican
Tom Angelis
Bob Costa – incumbent

Eastern Shore, Harford, and Cecil Counties

District 7
see above under Baltimore County

District 34A
This district covers southern Harford County, including Aberdeen and Havre de Grace, as well as a very small section along the Susquehanna River in western Cecil County.

Democratic
Mary-Dulany James – incumbent 
Marla Posey-Moss
B. Daniel Riley – incumbent 
Republican
Randolph Craig
Glen Glass
Patrick McGrady
John M. Paff, Jr.

District 34B
This district covers northern Cecil County, including Perryville, Rising Sun, Port Deposit, North East, and Charlestown.

Democratic
Joe Janusz
David D. Rudolph – incumbent 
Republican
Theodore A. Patterson
Constitution
Michael W. Dawson

District 35A
This district covers northern Harford County.

Democratic
Joseph J. Gutierrez
John W. Jones
Republican
Jason C. Gallion – running on a ticket with Dave Tritt 
Wayne Norman – incumbent, appointed in 2008 after then-Del. Barry Glassman (R) was appointed to the Maryland Senate.
Dave Seman
Donna Stifler – incumbent 
Dave Tritt – running on a ticket with Jason Gallion

District 35B
This district covers central Harford County, including Bel Air and Abingdon.

Democratic
John Janowich
Republican
Susan K. McComas – incumbent

District 36
This upper and middle Eastern Shore district covers eastern and southern  Cecil County, including Elkton, all of Kent and Queen Anne's Counties, and northeast Caroline County, including Denton.

Democratic
Arthur Hock
William C. Manlove – former Cecil County Commissioner 
Republican
Stephen S. Hershey, Jr.
Jay A. Jacobs – Rock Hall Mayor 
Michael D. Smigiel, Sr. – incumbent 
Richard A. Sossi – incumbent 

Declined
Republican
Mary Roe Walkup – incumbent, will retire at the age of 86

District 37A
This middle and lower Eastern Shore district covers parts of central Dorchester County, including parts of Cambridge and Hurlock, as well as parts of northern and central Wicomico County, including Hebron and parts of Salisbury.

Democratic
Rudolph C. Cane – incumbent 
Lavonzella "Von" Siggers
Republican
Dustin Mills

District 37B
This middle and lower Eastern Shore district covers the southwest portion of Caroline County, including Ridgely, Preston, and Federalsburg, all of Talbot County, most of Dorchester County except for parts in the central and northern parts, and western parts of Wicomico County, including Mardela Springs.

Democratic
Patrice L. Stanley
Republican
Adelaide C. Eckardt – incumbent 
Jeannie Haddaway-Riccio – incumbent

District 38A
This lower Eastern Shore district covers all of Somerset County and a part of south central Wicomico County, including Fruitland.

Democratic
Michael K. McCready – Somerset County Commissioners President 
Republican
Julie D. Brewington
John T. Cannon – Wicomico County Councilman-at-Large 
Charles James Otto
John K. Phoebus – lawyer 

Declined

Republican
Carolyn Elmore – incumbent, appointed in 2010 following the death of her husband, Del. Page Elmore.

District 38B
This district covers Worcester County and the eastern portion of Wicomico County, including Pittsville, Willards, Delmar, and parts of Salisbury.

Democratic
Norman Conway – incumbent 
Bernard John Hayden
Gee Williams – Mayor of Berlin
Republican
A. Kaye Kenney
Mike McDermott – Mayor of Pocomoke City
Marty Pusey
Joe Schanno

Declined

Democratic
Jim Mathias – incumbent, running for the Senate seat being vacated by Sen. J. Lowell Stoltzfus (R), who is retiring

Baltimore City

District 40
This west central Baltimore City district includes Mondawmin, Reservoir Hill, Bolton Hill, Charles Village, Mount Vernon, Druid Hill Park, Central Park Heights, Hampden, and Roland Park.

Democratic
Frank M. Conaway, Jr. – incumbent
Will J. Hanna, Jr.
Barbara A. Robinson – incumbent 
Shawn Z. Tarrant – incumbent

District 41
This northwest Baltimore City district includes Fallstaff, Cross County, Cheswolde, Mount Washington, Cross Keys, Coldspring, Woodberry, Glen, Pimlico, Howard Park, Edmondson Village, Westgate, and Allendale.

Democratic
Jill P. Carter – incumbent
Nathaniel T. Oaks – incumbent
Sandy Rosenberg – incumbent 

Republican
Mark Ehrlichmann

District 43
This north Baltimore district includes Bellona-Gittings, Cedarcroft, Idlewood, Glen Oaks, Harford-Echodale, Loch Raven, Homeland, Mid-Govans, Hillen, Arcardia, Pen Lucy, Guilford, and Waverly.

Democratic
Curt Anderson – incumbent 
Rodney C. Burris
Kelly Fox
Leon Winthly Hector, Sr.
Maggie McIntosh – incumbent 
Mary Washington – former professor of sociology at Lehigh University, Associate Director at an urban environmental organization 

Declined

Democratic
Scherod C. Barnes – incumbent, appointed in 2010 as a placeholder following Del. Doory's resignation
Ann Marie Doory – resigned from the House after being appointed by Gov. Martin O'Malley (D) to the Maryland State Board of Contract Appeals

District 44
This district covers West Baltimore, including Beechfield, Irvington, Saint Paul, Mount Winans, Lakeland, Morrell Park, Penrose, and Shipley Hall, and stretches into East Baltimore, including Middle East.

Democratic
Chris Blake
Gary T. English
Arlene B. Fisher
Keith E. Haynes – incumbent 
Ruth M. Kirk – incumbent
Keiffer J. Mitchell, Jr. – former Baltimore City Councilman and 2007 Democratic candidate for Mayor 
Melvin L. Stukes – incumbent
Billy Taylor
Wesley Wood
Republican
Brian D. Jones
Trae Lewis

District 45
This district covers East Baltimore, including Woodring, Taylor Heights, Overlea, Rosemont East, Westfield, Glenham-Belford, Cedmont, Clifton Park, Belair-Edison, and Claremont-Freedom.

Democratic
Talmadge Branch – incumbent 
Cheryl Glenn – incumbent
Hattie N. Harrison – incumbent 
Kevin Parson
Jamaal D. Simpson
Republican
Rick Saffery
Larry O. Wardlow, Jr.
Libertarian
Ronald M. Owens-Bey

District 46
This district covers South Baltimore, including Downtown, Inner Harbor, Pigtown, Federal Hill, Fells Point, and Canton.

Democratic
Luke Clippinger
Jason Filippou
Peter A. Hammen – incumbent 
Brian K. McHale – incumbent 
Bill Romani
Melissa A. Techentin – President of the Southeastern Police Community Relations Council 
Republican
Roger Bedingfield

Declined

Democratic
Carolyn J. Krysiak – incumbent, will retire

Notes and references

External links
Candidate blogs at The Baltimore Sun

general assembly
2010
Maryland General Assembly